Conasprella lusca is a species of sea snail, a marine gastropod mollusc in the family Conidae, the cone snails, cone shells or cones.

Distribution
This marine species occurs in the Caribbean Sea off the Turks and Caicos Islands.

References

Petuch E.J., Berschauer D.P. & Poremski A. (2017). New species of Jaspidiconus (Conidae: Conilithinae) from the Carolinian and Caribbean Molluscan Provinces. The Festivus. 49(3): 237-246.

lusca
Gastropods described in 2017